The Piedmont & Northern Railway  was a heavy electric interurban company operating over two disconnected divisions in North and South Carolina. Tracks spanned  total between the two segments, with the northern division running  from Charlotte, to Gastonia, North Carolina, including a three-mile (5 km) spur to Belmont. The southern division main line ran  from Greenwood to Spartanburg, South Carolina, with a  spur to Anderson. Initially the railroad was electrified at 1500 volts DC, however, much of the electrification was abandoned when dieselisation was completed in 1954.

Unlike similar interurban systems the Piedmont & Northern survived the Great Depression and was later absorbed into the Seaboard Coast Line Railroad in 1969. Although part of the railroad was abandoned between Greenwood and Honea Path and Belton to Anderson, much of the original system exists today as shortlines.

History

Although interurban railroads were not nearly as common in the sparsely populated and largely agrarian Deep South, there were a number of small electric networks constructed in the region throughout the early 20th century. Among them was the Anderson Traction Company, created on June 22, 1904, to build and operate within the city of Anderson. Eventually the railroad expanded to complete construction of an extension to Belton by 1910. The railroad was acquired by James B. Duke of Duke Power around the same time. 

On March 20, 1909, the Greenville, Spartanburg and Anderson Railway was chartered and presided over by Duke. The company used the Anderson Traction Company rails terminating at Belton as a starting point for northward construction to Greenville and construction toward Greenwood to the south, with both cities connected in November 1912. An extension from Greenville to Spartanburg was completed in April 1914. The North Carolina division started with the Piedmont Traction Company, also owned by Duke, and completed its route between Charlotte and Gastonia, North Carolina on  July 3, 1912.

Both sections were electrified to 1,500 volts DC with power supplied from mainly hydroelectric sources. Additionally both segments were built to steam road standards with minimal street running.

Consolidation

The Piedmont & Northern was created in 1914 to consolidate both the Greenville, Spartanburg & Anderson in South Carolina and the Piedmont Traction Company in North Carolina. In 1916 the railroad completed a  spur to Belmont, North Carolina. On numerous occasions the company sought to link the two disconnected segments and expand to Durham, North Carolina, however, the plans never materialized due to stiff resistance from the Southern Railway, which the P&N paralleled in both states.

Although many railroads were hostile to the Piedmont & Northern, a friend was found with the Seaboard Air Line, which connected with the P&N at Charlotte and Greenwood. Throughout its existence the P&N stressed interchange traffic over its efficient electric lines, and with good reason: the railroad shared numerous interchanges with several major railroads.

Network 

The P&N's network in 1964 was connected to the Clinchfield Railroad (CRR), Carolina and Northwestern Railway (Ca&NW), Georgia and Florida Railroad (G&F), Norfolk Southern (NS), Seaboard Air Line Railroad (SAL), Southern Railway (SOU), Atlantic Coast Line Railroad (ACL), Greenville and Northern Railroad (G&N), Charleston and Western Carolina (C&WC) and Ware Shoals Railroad.

Though owned by Duke Power, the P&N operated coal trains over a branch from Mount Holly, NC, to Terrell, NC, supplying Duke Power's Lake Norman powerplants.

Extension 
Plans to connect the North and South Carolina divisions between Spartanburg, SC and Gastonia, NC, and to expand northwards towards Winston-Salem, NC, were successfully blocked by appeals by the Southern Railway and other entities in court cases in the 1930s, specifically PIEDMONT & N. RY. CO. v. UNITED STATES, 280 U.S. 469 (1930) and PIEDMONT & N R. CO. v. INTERSTATE COMMERCE COMMISSION, 286 U.S. 299 (1932).

Traffic 
The P&N, though involved in extensive passenger operations, was primarily a heavy freight carrier. The most important commodity transported was coal and coke, but also of significance were cotton (including cotton waste) and paper.

(Data from P&N 1955 Annual Report)

Remnants

Remaining structures 
Only four of the stations built for the P&N, designed by Charles Christian Hook are still in existence today in North Carolina. 

The Thrift depot in the Paw Creek community in Charlotte, NC is the only remaining P&N station in Mecklenburg County, NC; it is presently for sale."

In Gaston County, several structures are still standing. The depot in Mount Holly, North Carolina is still standing and is used as a hair salon. The former P&N depot in Belmont, NC has been restored and was a P&N museum until 2004, when the lease ran out and was not given extension by the owner. The former P&N station in Gastonia, NC, burned down in 1995. Lastly, the small depot of McAdenville, NC is still standing, though it has been relocated from its previous location.

 

In South Carolina, at least four stations are still standing: Donalds, Hodges, Greer, and Anderson. The abandoned depot at Pelzer burned on the night on January 26, 2011, and shortly afterward it and the nearby Piedmont station were demolished by the CSX which had refused to support a local effort to save the Pelzer station.  

Nothing remains of the P&N in Honea Path, SC, apart from power poles still standing, delineating the former right-of-way.

The station at Taylors, SC was still standing in 1987. Though it is now gone, a former substation - including some overhead poles of the P&N line - can still be found near the CSX's Enoree River viaduct.

The former P&N RR Charlotte terminal freight depot was in the Mint/Graham/Second(MLK)St /Third St block, while the Charlotte terminal passenger depot was in the Mint/Graham/Third St/Fourth St block in Charlotte. BB&T Ballpark now sits on the former depot site.

Existing lines, current operations 

Some of the P&N's former lines are still in existence, with limited amounts still in operation. The track from Pelzer, SC to Spartanburg, SC is the CSX's Belton Subdivision. The segment from Pelzer to Belton was taken over by the Greenville and Western Railway in 2006. In Gaston County, the track from Mt. Holly, NC to Gastonia, NC and from Mount Holly to Belmont, NC is still in place. Initially the track belonged to CSX; it is now owned by the North Carolina Department of Transportation, which awarded a contract in May 2010 to Patriot Rail Corporation to restore the track and operate trains along the  line. Since May 2022, this segment is operated by Charlotte Western Railroad.

References 

 

Defunct North Carolina railroads
Defunct South Carolina railroads
Former Class I railroads in the United States
Predecessors of CSX Transportation
Railway companies established in 1911
Railway companies disestablished in 1969
Interurban railways in North Carolina
Interurban railways in South Carolina
American companies established in 1911